The Technical High School of Limeira (Portuguese: Colégio Técnico de Limeira, COTIL) is a public high school maintained by the State University of Campinas. Its campus is located in Limeira, São Paulo, Brazil. The school was founded in 1967.

COTIL provides courses in computer science, mechanical engineering, nursing, civil engineering, geomatics, and quality & productivity.

External links 
 COTIL webpage
 UNICAMP webpage

Schools in Brazil
University of Campinas
Limeira